is a city located in Tochigi Prefecture, Japan. , the city had an estimated population of 78,720 in 30203 households, and a population density of 476 persons per km². Moka is known for the Mooka Railway, which operates steam locomotives. The train line stretches from Shimodate, Ibaraki Prefecture to Motegi, Tochigi Prefecture. The town produces 7,000 tons of strawberries annually. The name of the city is given as "Moka City" per the city's official website; however, the local train station is "Mōka Station", and the direct transliteration of the city name into Hepburn romanization is "Mooka".

Geography
Mooka is located in southeast Tochigi Prefecture. It is located approximately 100 kilometer from Tokyo metropolis and 15 kilometers from the prefectural capital of Utsunomiya

Surrounding municipalities
Tochigi Prefecture
 Utsunomiya
 Oyama
 Shimotsuke
 Haga
 Ichikai
 Mashiko
 Kaminokawa
Ibaraki Prefecture
 Chikusei
 Sakuragawa

Climate
Mooka has a Humid continental climate (Köppen Cfa) characterized by warm summers and cold winters with heavy snowfall.

Demographics
Per Japanese census data, the population of Mooka has recently plateaued after a long period of growth.

History
During the Edo Period, much of the area was tenryō territory under direct control of the Tokugawa Shogunate or various hatamoto. Towards the end of the Edo Period, the daimyō of Odawara, Ōkubo Tadazane attempted to develop waste land with the assistance of Ninomiya Sontoku. The town on Mooka was established within Tsuga District, Tochigi on April 1, 1889 with the creation of the modern municipalities system. Mooka annexed the neighboring villages of Yamazeki, Ouchi and Naka on March 31, 1954. It was elevated to city status on October 1, 1954.

On March 23, 2009, the town of Ninomiya (from Haga District) was merged into Mooka.

Government
Mooka has a mayor-council form of government with a directly elected mayor and a unicameral city assembly of 21 members. Mooka collectively contributes two members to the Tochigi Prefectural Assembly. In terms of national politics, the city is part of Tochigi 4th district of the lower house of the Diet of Japan.

Economy
Mooka is a regional commercial center with a mixed economy. Agriculture centers primarily on rice production and fruits. Traditional industries of sake brewing and cotton weaving have largely been replaced by light manufacturing of automotive and electronic components, primarily for the nearby Nissan factory in Kaminokawa and Honda factory in Tsuga.

Education
Mooka has 14 public primary schools and nine public middle schools operated by the city government. and four high schools. The city has four public high schools operated by the Tochigi Prefectural Board of Education.

It previously hosted the Colégio Pitágoras Brasil, a Brazilian school.

Transportation

Railway
Mooka Railway Mooka Line
 -  -  -  -  -

Highway
  – Mooka Interchange

Local attractions
Osaki Jinja
site of Nakamura Castle

External relations
 – Douliu, Taiwan
 – Glendora, California, USA

Noted people
Takanori Hoshino, voice actor
Nándor Wagner, artist and sculptor

References

External links

Official Website 

Cities in Tochigi Prefecture
Mooka, Tochigi